Piperidione (trade name Sedulon) is a sedative drug, structurally related to methyprylon and pyrithyldione.
It used to be marketed by Roche as a cough medicine available in liquid form. In the US, it was approved by the FDA on grounds of safety alone in 1947. After Roche failed to submit evidence of efficacy to the Drug Efficacy Study Implementation program in 1972, it was withdrawn from the US market.

See also 
Glutethimide

References 

Withdrawn drugs
Antitussives
2-Piperidinones
GABAA receptor positive allosteric modulators
Sedatives
4-Piperidinones